Kalamalka Lake Provincial Park and Protected Area is a provincial park in Coldstream, British Columbia, Canada. Kalamalka Lake Provincial Park and Protected Area adopted its current name from Kalamalka Lake, for which it is located on its shore. During the process of entering summer, calcium carbonate forms crystals that reflect sunlight and create the vivid blue and green colours. Temperature changes in the fall and the spring sometimes create ribbons of deep blue colour in the lake, seen from the park.

The park is a preserved remnant of the natural grasslands that once stretched from Vernon to Osoyoos. There are several forests and cross-country ski trails available throughout the year, along with two archaeological sites. Mammals include coyote, deer, black bear, Columbian ground squirrel, marmot, mink, bobcat and red fox.

References

Provincial parks in the Okanagan
Provincial parks of British Columbia
1975 establishments in British Columbia
Protected areas established in 1975
Osoyoos Division Yale Land District